Duncan Spedding (born 7 September 1977) is an English former footballer who played as a midfielder.

Spedding was signed by Southampton in 1997 after completing a spell as a trainee with the club. However, he failed to make much impact and was given a free transfer to Northampton Town the following year. Spedding spent five seasons at the club as a regular first teamer before departing in 2003. Now retired, Spedding manages a health club in Northampton.

References

External links

1977 births
English footballers
Living people
Northampton Town F.C. players
People from Camberley
Premier League players
Southampton F.C. players
Association football midfielders